Clinton Airport is an airport in Clinton, Indiana, United States (FAA: 1I7).

Clinton Airport may also refer to:

 Clinton Field in Wilmington, Ohio, United States (FAA: I66)
 Clinton Regional Airport in Clinton, Oklahoma, United States (FAA: CLK)
 Clinton Memorial Airport in Clinton, Missouri, United States (FAA: GLY)
 Clinton Municipal Airport (disambiguation), several airports
 Clinton National Airport, Little Rock, Arkansas (FAA: LIT)
 Clinton-Sherman Airport in Clinton, Oklahoma, United States (FAA: CSM)